Young-joo, also spelled Young-ju, Yong-joo, or Yong-ju, is a Korean unisex given name. Its meaning depends on the hanja used to write each syllable of the name. There are 34 hanja with the reading "young" and 56 hanja with the reading "joo" on the South Korean government's official list of hanja which may be registered for use in given names. 

People with this name include:
Kim Yong-ju (born 1920), North Korean politician, younger brother of Kim Il-sung
Suh Yong-joo (born 1934), South Korean long jumper
Kim Young-joo (born 1957), South Korean male football referee
YoungJu Choie (born 1959), South Korean female mathematician
Byun Young-joo (born 1966), South Korean female film director
Sarah Chang (born Young-Joo Chang, 1980), Korean American female violinist
Seo Young-joo (born 1998), South Korean actor

Fictional characters with this name include:
Joo Young-joo, in 2004 South Korean film Too Beautiful to Lie
Na Young-joo, in 2018 South Korean television series Where Stars Land

See also
List of Korean given names

References

Korean unisex given names